Worker's House at Lower Laurel Iron Works is a historic double house located in Newlin Township, Chester County, Pennsylvania. It was built about 1870, and is a two-story, four-bay, frame two family dwelling with German siding. It has a gable roof and full basement and attic. It has a two-story, shed-roofed rear addition.  It features a full width front porch.  It is the only remaining worker's house built by Hugh E. Steele and associated with the Lower Laurel Iron Works.

It was added to the National Register of Historic Places in 1985.

References

Houses on the National Register of Historic Places in Pennsylvania
Houses completed in 1870
Houses in Chester County, Pennsylvania
National Register of Historic Places in Chester County, Pennsylvania